Doha or Ad-Dawhah is the capital city of Qatar. It may also refer to:

Places
Ad-Dawhah (municipality), the Qatar municipality that includes Doha city
Doha, Iran, a village in Isfahan Province, Iran
Doha, Kuwait, a town in Jahra Governorate, Kuwait
al-Dawha, a city in the West Bank, Palestinian territories
Downtown Hartford, the Downtown area of Hartford, Connecticut

People
Abu Doha, Algerian al Qaeda suspect who is alleged to have ties to various millennium bomb plots
Doha Kang, South Korean manhwa artist

Other
Doha Stadium, a football stadium in Sakhnin, Israel
Doha Sports City, Qatar
Doha (Indian literature), a lyrical verse form
Doha (poetry), a style of Apabhraṃśa and Hindi poetry
Doha Declaration, an agreement adopted by the World Trade Organization Ministerial Conference of 2001 in Doha, Qatar concerning intellectual property rights to medicines
Doha Development Round, a set of World Trade Organization talks that began in 2001 in Doha, Qatar
Doha Amendment, a 2012 amendment to the Kyoto Protocol
Agony of Doha, a term used to refer to Japan's qualification match for 1994 FIFA World Cup  with Iraq, held in Doha in 1993

See also
Doha conference (disambiguation), for conferences and meetings held in Doha
Dohar
Dołha (pronounced "doha"), a village in Poland